Bilde is a surname. Notable people with the surname include:

 Bruno Bilde (born 1976), French politician
 Dennis Bilde (born 1989), Danish bridge player
 Dominique Bilde (born 1953), French politician
 Gilles De Bilde (born 1971), Belgian footballer
 Poul Bilde (1938–2021), Danish footballer